Winterland was an old ice skating rink and 5,400 seat music venue in San Francisco, California.

Winterland may also refer to:

 Winterland, Newfoundland and Labrador, Canada
 "Winterland" (Journeyman), the eighth episode of the first season of Journeyman
 "Winterland", a song by the German rock band Unheilig
 Winterland (The Jimi Hendrix Experience album), 2011
 Winterland (Sarah Dawn Finer album), 2010
 Winterland, San Francisco, CA, 12/31/77, a 2009 album by the New Riders of the Purple Sage
 Winterland, a 1998 album by Emma Townshend

See also
 Summerland (disambiguation)